Pergetus is a genus of antlike flower beetles in the family Anthicidae. There are at least two described species in Pergetus.

Species
These two species belong to the genus Pergetus:
 Pergetus campanulatus (LeConte, 1874)
 Pergetus wilati (Lacordaire, 1859)

References

Further reading

 

Anthicidae
Articles created by Qbugbot